Geraldton is an electoral district of the Legislative Assembly in the Australian state of Western Australia.

Geraldton was one of the original 30 seats contested at the 1890 colonial election. The district is based on the eponymous regional city.

Labor held throughout most of the twentieth century, Geraldton has since become a seat that has changed hands regularly in the last two decades.

Geography
The district has always been based on the regional coastal city of Geraldton. Electoral reform ahead of the 2008 state election necessitated an increase in the district's enrolment and thus an expansion of its boundaries, as it did for all non-metropolitan districts. This means the district now includes all outlying suburbs of the city, as well as adjacent rural areas. The district's current boundaries are identical with the former City of Geraldton-Greenough, itself a newly formed local government area.

History
Geraldton changed hands frequently between different members and parties during the early history of the seat in the late 19th and early 20th century. After 1914 however, the seat was held by the Labor Party for all but three of the next 77 years. The seat's longest serving and most famous member was John Willcock, member from 1917 to 1947 and Premier of Western Australia from 1936 to 1945.

A fairly safe to safe Labor seat for much of the 20th century, it became somewhat less safe for Labor in the 1980s. The resignation of Labor member Jeff Carr following his sacking as minister in 1991 triggered a by-election that was won by the Liberal Party's Bob Bloffwitch, the seat's first non-Labor member in more than four decades. Bloffwitch held the seat at the subsequent 1993 state election, when the Liberal Party won government. The seat changed hands with the next change of government at the 2001 state election when Labor candidate Shane Hill was elected. Hill held the seat for two terms before Liberal Ian Blayney won it with a change of government at the 2008 state election. In fact the redistribution prior to that election had turned the seat into a notionally Liberal seat.

In 2013, Blayney seemingly consolidated his hold on the seat with Labor falling to third place behind the National Party. Blayney's margin was enough for him to narrowly overcome one of the biggest swings amid Labor's decisive victory at the subsequent election in 2017, with Labor's Lara Dalton paring back his margin from a seemingly insurmountable 22.8 percent to an extremely marginal 1.3 percent. Blayney's victory marked only the second time since World War I (Bloffwitch's 1991 by-election win being the first) that Labor had been in government without holding Geraldton. Blayney defected to the Nationals in 2019, but was heavily defeated by Dalton in 2021. Dalton actually won enough votes on the first count to take the seat outright.

Members for Geraldton

Election results

References

External links
 
 
 
 
 

Geraldton